The sensorimotor network (SMN), also known as somatomotor network, is a large-scale brain network that primarily includes somatosensory (postcentral gyrus) and motor (precentral gyrus) regions and extends to the supplementary motor areas (SMA). The auditory cortex may also be included. The SMN is activated during motor tasks, such as finger tapping, indicating that the network readies the brain when performing and coordinating motor tasks.

Clinical significance 
Dysfunction in the SMN has been implicated in various neuropsychiatric disorders.
 Bipolar Disorder: The psychomotor disturbances that characterize the depressive and manic phases of bipolar disorder may be related to dysfunction in the sensorimotor network (SMN) and its balance with other large-scale networks such as the default mode network.
 Amyotrophic Lateral Sclerosis: Altered functional connectivity patterns in the SMN may contribute to various symptoms in the neurodegenerative disease .

Nomenclature 
In 2019, Uddin et al. proposed that pericentral network (PN) be used as a standard anatomical name for the network.

References 

Neuroscience
Brain